The 2021 Western Michigan Broncos football team represented Western Michigan University in the 2021 NCAA Division I FBS football season. The Broncos played their home games at Waldo Stadium in Kalamazoo, Michigan, and competed in the West Division of the Mid-American Conference (MAC). The team was led by fifth-year head coach Tim Lester.

Schedule
The following was WMU's schedule.

Rankings

References

       

Western Michigan
Western Michigan Broncos football seasons
Quick Lane Bowl champion seasons
Western Michigan Broncos football